006 is the code name of Alec Trevelyan, a villain in the James Bond film GoldenEye.

006 may also refer to:

The number six (6)
Agent 006 in the James Bond universe, other than Alec Trevelyan, see 00 Agent
BAR 006, British American Racing's car for the 2004 Formula One season
Tyrrell 006, Team Tyrell's 1972 Formula One season car
Singapore Airlines Flight 006, a scheduled passenger flight
China Airlines Flight 006, a daily non-stop flight

See also
Six (disambiguation)